The Smoking (Public Health) Ordinance is a law in Hong Kong enacted in 1982 for smoking bans and regulation of sales of tobacco products. It has been amended several times ever since and the latest substantial amendment, known as the Smoking (Public Health) (Amendment) Ordinance 2006, was passed by the Legislative Council on 19 October 2006, and gazetted on 27 October 2006.

The 2006 amendment was delayed for six years due to the efforts of the Liberal Party. The law only managed to pass by the government acceding to the Liberal Party's demands for smoking exemptions (expired August 2009).  Any licensed bar and karaoke could apply under a paper exercise to receive "Qualified Establishment" status, which was granted by the Department of Health. 

The Smoking Ban, as it is commonly referred to, bans smoking indoors in restaurants which sell more food than liquor, indoor workplaces other than exempted bars, mahjong parlours, saunas and karaoke centres, schools, as well as beaches, swimming pools, sports grounds and most public parks. The latest extension of the ban came into force on 1 January 2007. The establishments exempt from the ban would have to be smoke-free by August 2009. The law also empowers the government to designate certain public areas, mainly public transport interchanges, as no-smoking areas. The first group of such places went smoke-free on 1 September 2009. Starting from 31 March 2016, 8 bus interchanges located at tunnel portal areas are also zoned as no-smoking areas.

Apart from a smoking ban in public places, the newly revised ordinance also imposes more stringent restrictions on sale of tobacco products. Packets must bear health warnings that contain images portraying consequences of smoking.

Subsequently, a bill was presented to the same Legislative Council that streamlined the penalty procedures for someone caught flouting the smoking ban and made it on par with littering offences. The bill was passed on 2008 and took effect on 1 September 2009. Under the new law, anyone caught smoking in prohibited areas would receive a fixed penalty of HK$1,500.

References

External links

Hong Kong legislation
Tobacco control
Smoking in Hong Kong
1982 in law
2006 in law